Hastula alboflava is a species of sea snail, a marine gastropod mollusc in the family Terebridae, the auger snails.

Description

Distribution
This marine species occurs off the Philippines.

References

 Bratcher, T., 1988. Six new species of Terebridae (Mollusca: Gastropoda) from Panama and Indo-West Pacific. The Veliger 30(4): 412–416
 Terryn Y. (2007). Terebridae: A Collectors Guide. Conchbooks & Natural Art. 59 pp + plates

External links
 Fedosov, A. E.; Malcolm, G.; Terryn, Y.; Gorson, J.; Modica, M. V.; Holford, M.; Puillandre, N. (2020). Phylogenetic classification of the family Terebridae (Neogastropoda: Conoidea). Journal of Molluscan Studies. 85(4): 359–388

Terebridae
Gastropods described in 1988